Rinoa was an English post-metal group, formed in Essex in 2007. Their line-up consisted of vocalist Perry Bryan, guitarists Matthew Holden and Jozef Norocky, bassist David 
Gumbleton and drummer James May. The band split in November 2010, with most of their members going on to different musical projects.

History
Rinoa was formed in Essex in 2007, following the break-up of the members' previous bands, Crydebris, Chariots and Symmetry. They named themselves after Rinoa Heartilly, a character from the video game Final Fantasy VIII.

The band released their self-titled EP, Rinoa, in 2008.
This was followed with a split EP with Bossk, released in 2009. The band performed at Damnation Festival later that same year. Their debut full-length, An Age Among Them, was released in 2010 to positive reviews, including being named one of the best albums of 2010 by Rock Sound.

In October 2010 Rinoa announced their intention to split at the end of their headline UK tour and played their last ever show in Bristol in November.

Following their split James May joined dubstep group Tek-One, and Jozef Norocky joined London band Devil Sold His Soul, with Matthew Holden and David Gumbleton joining a new supergroup called Ancients.

Band members
Perry Bryan - vocals
Matthew Holden - guitar
David Gumbleton - bass guitar
Jozef Norocky - guitar
James May - drums

Discography

Studio albums
An Age Among Them (2010)

EPs
Rinoa (EP) (2008)

Splits
Bossk / Rinoa (2009)

Singles
"Sol Winds" (2010)

References

English post-rock groups
Post-metal musical groups
Musical groups established in 2007
Musical groups disestablished in 2010